Alfred Léonard Loewenstein  (11 March 1877 – 4 July 1928) was a Belgian financier. At his peak in the 1920s, Loewenstein was worth around £12 million in the currency of the time (equivalent to £ million in ), making him the third-richest person in the world at the time. His wealth came from investments in electric power and artificial silk businesses when those industries were in their infancy. Loewenstein is remembered today for his mysterious disappearance and death in 1928.

Early life and business career
Alfred Loewenstein was born to Bernard Loewenstein, a German-Jewish banker in Brussels, Belgium, who converted to Catholicism. Alfred established his own banking concern, and was a wealthy man by 1914. Loewenstein offered his government in exile US$50 million, interest-free, to stabilize the Belgian currency in return for the right to print Belgian francs. The offer was refused. At war's end, he maintained a residence in England where he ran an investment business that made him one of Europe's most powerful financiers. He partnered with the investment house of Canadian-born Sir James Dunn in several business ventures, the duo emerging with more than £1,000,000 profit from their 1920s investment in British Celanese alone.

Loewenstein was an owner of a successful stable of thoroughbred steeplechase race horses. His horses won the 1926 and 1928 runnings of the Grand Steeple-Chase de Paris.

Business successes

Loewenstein made an enormous fortune providing electric power facilities for developing countries worldwide through his Belgian-based company, Société Internationale d'Énergie Hydro-Électrique (SIDRO). By the mid-1920s, Loewenstein's reputation was such that he was consulted by heads of state from around the globe. The British government made Loewenstein a Companion of The Most Honourable Order of the Bath.

In 1926, Loewenstein established "International Holdings and Investments Limited", which raised huge amounts of capital from wealthy investors wishing to get aboard his bandwagon of success. However, he was rebuffed in his attempt to take over a Canadian company called Barcelona Traction, Light, and Power, a huge operation building infrastructure in Brazil.

In 1926, he bought a sumptuous house in Biarritz, in the French Basque Country, with a view on the Bay of Biscay and the Atlantic Ocean. In 2019, Sotheby's International Realty shows the house.

Alleged drug deal with Arnold Rothstein
In his biography of gangster Arnold Rothstein titled "Rothstein: The Life, Times, and Murder of the Criminal Genius Who Fixed the 1919 World Series", author David Pietrusza alleged that Loewenstein became partners with Rothstein to fund a major drugs deal in spring 1928, and that his death would have cut off the necessary funding, causing Rothstein to dig deeper into his already stretched resources to prevent the deal collapsing.

Disappearance
On the evening of 4 July 1928, Loewenstein left from Croydon Airport to fly to Brussels on his private aircraft, a Fokker F.VIIa/3m trimotor (G-EBYI), along with six other people. In Loewenstein's aircraft, a door at the rear of the main passenger cabin opened on to a short passage with two doors: the one on the right led to the lavatory, while the one on the left was the aircraft's entrance door.

When Loewenstein had not reappeared after some time, his secretary went in search of him and discovered that the lavatory was empty, while the aircraft's entrance door was open and flapping in the slipstream. The employee (along with the others on the aircraft) asserted his belief that Loewenstein had fallen through the aircraft's rear door and plunged several thousand feet to his death in the English Channel. The aircraft landed first on the beach, before transferring to the airfield at Saint-Inglevert, Pas-de-Calais, France.

News and investigation
News of Loewenstein's demise caused panic selling in his corporations' publicly traded shares, which immediately plummeted in value by more than fifty percent.

On 12 July 1928, it was reported that tests had been conducted by the Accidents Branch of the British Air Ministry using Loewenstein's aircraft. However, he was immediately thrown back into the aircraft when the slipstream violently slammed the door shut. It was concluded that it would have been impossible for someone to accidentally open the door and fall out.

Loewenstein's body was discovered near Boulogne on 19 July 1928 and was taken by fishing boat to Calais, where his identity was confirmed by means of his wristwatch; an autopsy was performed (at the request of his family), his brother-in-law stating that they did not suspect anyone of foul play, but that they did not want anyone to suggest after the burial that Loewenstein might have been poisoned or had died in the aircraft and then been thrown out. The autopsy revealed a partial fracture of Loewenstein's skull and several broken bones; it was concluded that he had been alive when he struck the water.

Loewenstein was buried in a cemetery outside Evere, in a tomb belonging to his wife's family, the Misonnes. However, his name was never carved on the slab covering his casket, so he was in effect buried in an unmarked grave.

Theories
Many theories have been put forward as to exactly what had happened to Loewenstein in the back of his aircraft; some suspected a criminal conspiracy in which his employees murdered him. The New York Times hypothesised that a growing absent-mindedness, noted by many of Loewenstein's acquaintances, may have caused him to walk out the wrong door of the aircraft. Because he had left behind a tangled web of business ventures, many of which were highly leveraged, others theorized that his business empire was on the verge of collapse. Some even asserted that corrupt business practices were about to be exposed and that Loewenstein, therefore, committed suicide. None of these theories were ever proven.

In 1987, William Norris wrote Loewenstein's story in a book titled The Man Who Fell From the Sky (New York: Viking, 1987). Norris presents evidence in support of his case that, if Loewenstein's death was not a conspiracy by business rivals and associates, a certain opportunism existed regarding the death of the tycoon and his insurance. He also shows that later events are frequently ignored, such as the fact that Loewenstein's son Robert shot one of the family servants under murky circumstances within a decade or so after the tragedy. The son was himself killed in an aviation accident in 1941 while serving with the Air Transport Auxiliary. Norris concluded that Loewenstein had been thrown from the aircraft by the pilot, Donald Drew, at the behest of Madeleine Loewenstein, the motive being to gain control of his fortune. He suggested that the aircraft's rear door was completely removed while in the air, and a replacement later fitted on the beach at St. Pol.

Crime writers Robert and Carol Bridgestock have speculated that Loewenstein faked his own death and disappeared because of the financial irregularities in his businesses. This theory is supported by the facts that the body was buried in an unmarked grave, and that his wife did not attend the funeral.

In popular culture
 In 2010, Loewenstein's death was the subject of an episode of the History Channel's Vanishings! series.
In 2014, Loewenstein's death was the subject of an episode of BBC Radio 4's Punt PI.
In 2021, Loewenstein's death was the subject of the final episode of Buzzfeed Unsolved: True Crime.

See also

J. P. Morgan
Andrew Carnegie
John D. Rockefeller
William A. Clark
William Jackson Palmer
Joseph Pulitzer
Cornelius Vanderbilt
Henry Ford
Marjorie Merriweather Post
Marcus Daly
William Barstow Strong
William Randolph Hearst

General
List of unsolved deaths
List of people who disappeared mysteriously at sea

Publications
 William Norris: The Man Who Fell From the Sky. New York, Viking, 1987. 
 Maurice Privat: La vie et la mort d'Alfred Loewenstein. Paris, La nouvelle société d'édition, 1929
 E. Phillips Oppenheim: Who Travels Alone. The Life and Death of Alfred Loewenstein Project Gutenberg Australia. (e-book, 2012). Accessed 23 Dec. 2015

References

External links
 BBC audio with podcast link for Punt PI Series 7 Episode 1 The Mysterious Death of Flying Millionaire Alfred Loewenstein
 Loewenstein listed among famous people who died in aviation accidents in the 1920s
 

1877 births
1920s missing person cases
1928 deaths
Belgian bankers
Belgian expatriates in the United Kingdom
Belgian financiers
Belgian investors
Belgian Jews
Belgian people of German-Jewish descent
Belgian Roman Catholics
Belgian soldiers
Businesspeople from Brussels
Converts to Roman Catholicism
Deaths by falling out of an aircraft
Formerly missing people
Honorary Companions of the Order of the Bath
Recipients of the Legion of Honour
Racehorse owners and breeders
Unsolved deaths
Victims of aviation accidents or incidents in 1928